Markus Treichl (born 28 September 1993) is an Austrian bobsledder. He competed in the two-man event at the 2018 and 2022 Winter Olympics.

References

External links
 

1993 births
Living people
Austrian male bobsledders
Olympic bobsledders of Austria
Bobsledders at the 2018 Winter Olympics
Bobsledders at the 2022 Winter Olympics
Place of birth missing (living people)
21st-century Austrian people